Parmentiera stenocarpa is a species of plant in the family Bignoniaceae. It is endemic to Colombia.

References

stenocarpa
Vulnerable plants
Endemic flora of Colombia
Taxonomy articles created by Polbot